Frank Manley (13 November 1930 – 11 November 2009) was Charles Howard Candler Professor of Renaissance Literature at Emory University and an award-winning fiction author.

Life
Born in Scranton, Pennsylvania, in 1930, Manley was educated at the Marist School in Atlanta and went on to study English literature at Emory University, where he graduated B.A. in 1952 and M.A. in 1953. He obtained his Ph.D. from Johns Hopkins University in 1959. He taught English at Yale University from 1959 to 1964 before returning to Emory as an associate professor in 1964. He remained there until his retirement in 2000, from 1982 as Charles Howard Candler Professor of Renaissance Literature. He founded a creative writing programme and co-founded the Playwriting Center.

From around 1970 Manley published as a creative artist, with poems, plays, short stories and novels to his name.  He was twice awarded a Georgia Author of the Year Award, for the novel The Cockfighter (1998) and for the short story collection Among Prisoners (2000). His main academic publications were an edition of John Donne's Anniversaries (1963) and an edition of Thomas More's Dialogue of Comfort against Tribulation (1976).

Frank Manley Elementary School in Drayton Plains, Michigan was named in his honor.

Works

Poetry
 Resultances (1980)
 The Emperors (2001)

Plays
 Two Masters (1985)
 Prior Engagements (1987)
 The Evidence (1990)
 Married Life (1996)
 Learning to Dance (1998)

Prose fiction
 Within the Ribbons (1989) - short stories (reviewed in the LA Times)
 The Cockfighter (1998) - novel (reviewed in the New York Times)
 Among Prisoners (2000) - short stories
 True Hope (2002) - novel

External links
 http://www.emory.edu/EMORY_MAGAZINE/spring99/briefs_drmwvr_pgs/people_brief.html
 http://www.georgiaencyclopedia.org/articles/arts-culture/frank-manley-1930-2009
 http://clatl.com/atlanta/emory-university-pays-tribute-to-the-late-frank-manley/Content?oid=1286555
 http://www.artsatl.com/2010/01/remembering-atlanta-playwright-poet-storyteller-frank-manley-by-vincent-murphy/ 
 http://www.gf.org/fellows/9313-frank-manley 
Stuart A. Rose Manuscript, Archives, and Rare Book Library, Emory University: Frank Manley papers, 1959-2009

1930 births
2009 deaths
Novelists from Georgia (U.S. state)
Emory University alumni
Writers from Scranton, Pennsylvania
Johns Hopkins University alumni
Yale University faculty
Emory University faculty
20th-century American novelists
20th-century American dramatists and playwrights
20th-century American poets
American male novelists
American male poets
American male dramatists and playwrights
American male short story writers
20th-century American short story writers
20th-century American male writers
Novelists from Pennsylvania
Novelists from Connecticut